The Nokia 3-digit series are a series of feature and  smartphones by HMD Global and previously by Microsoft Mobile and Nokia, generally aimed at developing markets.

History

Under Nokia 

Nokia originally launched the brand for low end devices aimed at developing markets but among the series' original operating systems was the primarily smartphone-aimed operating system, Symbian which was discontinued in October 2011. And after the depreciation of Symbian Nokia started to exclusively use S30 and S40 as their feature phone platforms.

Under Microsoft 

Microsoft completed its acquisition of Nokia's devices and services divisions in 2014 after which they continued developing and selling Nokia's feature phone range but decided to discontinue S30 and S40 in favour of S30+. With the release of newer devices Microsoft started to add their services such as Bing, MSN Weather, and GroupMe to the operating system. In June 2016, Microsoft sold the series as part of its feature phone sale to HMD Global.

Under HMD Global
HMD Global completed the acquisition from Microsoft and started manufacturing Nokia-branded phones in late 2016.

List of devices

Phones running Nokia Series 30 under Nokia 
 Nokia 100
 Nokia 101
 Nokia 103
 Nokia 105
 Nokia 106
 Nokia 107

Phones running Nokia Series 30+ 

Under Nokia

 Nokia 108
 Nokia 220
 Nokia 225

Under Microsoft

 Nokia 105 (2015)
 Nokia 130
 Nokia 215
 Nokia 216
 Nokia 222
 Nokia 230

Under HMD Global

 Nokia 105 (2017)
 Nokia 105 (2019)
 Nokia 106 (2018)
 Nokia 110 (2019)
 Nokia 125
 Nokia 130 (2017)
 Nokia 150
 Nokia 150 (2020)
 Nokia 210 (2019)

Phones running Smart Feature OS under HMD Global 
 Nokia 215 4G
 Nokia 220 4G
 Nokia 225 4G
 Nokia 800 Tough

Phones running Nokia Series 40 under Nokia 
 Nokia 109
 Nokia 110
 Nokia 111
 Nokia 112
 Nokia 113
 Nokia 114
 Nokia 206
 Nokia 207
 Nokia 208
 Nokia 301
 Nokia 515

Phones running Symbian under Nokia 
 Nokia 500
 Nokia 600 (Cancelled) 
 Nokia 603
 Nokia 700
 Nokia 701
 Nokia 808 PureView

See also 
 List of Nokia products
 Microsoft hardware
 Microsoft Lumia
 History of mobile phones

References

External links 
 Official site

Nokia 3-digit series